My Windows Phone (previously Windows Phone Live) was a free online companion service for Windows Phone mobile devices from Microsoft. The service, released in conjunction with the launch of Windows Phone 7 on October 21, 2010, provides users with a free mobile phone back-up solution by wirelessly synchronizing contacts, calendar appointments, photos, and OneNote notebooks with a various tightly integrated Windows Live services including Outlook.com People and Calendar, and Microsoft OneDrive. Users can access and manage their information stored on their Windows Phone devices via a password protected online portal using their Microsoft account. My Windows Phone also includes the Find My Phone service which facilitates tracking of a lost or stolen phone over the Internet or by messages. Similar phone finder services under various names are available for other families of smartphones. A similar service for Windows Mobile devices was available with Microsoft My Phone, withdrawn in 2011.

The service was updated on September 27, 2011 in conjunction with the release of Windows Phone 7.5 "Mango" update, adding support for Microsoft Scrapbook and account management features including viewing app purchase history and reinstall apps from the Windows Phone Store. With the Windows Phone 8 "Apollo" update, Microsoft has increased the age requirement for a separate Microsoft account from 13 to 18 and added the My Family feature to My Windows Phone, allowing parents to manage their child's accounts (including accounts with a birth date between 13-17 years of age prior to this update) running Windows Phone 8 (which was later incorporated in PCs running Windows 10). In February 2015 Microsoft moved the Find My Phone feature from the Windows Phone site to the Microsoft account website in preparation for Windows 10.

Features 
My Windows Phone offers the following features:

See also
Windows Live
My Phone

References

External links
My Windows Phone – 

Microsoft cloud services
Cloud applications
Windows Phone
Computer-related introductions in 2010